Franz Anton (born 23 October 1989) is a German slalom canoeist who has competed at the international level since 2006. He specialized in the C1 class from the start of his career. Between 2012 and 2018 he was also competing in the C2 class together with Jan Benzien.

He won nine medals at the ICF Canoe Slalom World Championships with two golds (C1: 2018, C2: 2015), four silvers (C1 team: 2010, 2013, 2015; C2 team: 2015), and three bronzes (C1: 2014, 2021, 2022). He also won seven medals at the European Championships (3 golds, 2 silvers and 2 bronzes).

At the 2016 Summer Olympics, he placed 4th in the C2 event, together with teammate Jan Benzien.

Anton took up canoeing aged nine at the Meissner Canoe Club, together with his brother Albrecht, who is also a slalom canoeist. He works as a police officer and is married to Rebecca Juttner.

World Cup individual podiums

References

External links

Official website

 – accessed 12 September 2010.

1989 births
German male canoeists
Living people
Canoeists at the 2016 Summer Olympics
Olympic canoeists of Germany
Medalists at the ICF Canoe Slalom World Championships
People from Wittenberg
Sportspeople from Saxony-Anhalt